Karlin is an unincorporated community in the U.S. state of Michigan. Part of Grant Township, Karlin is within Grand Traverse County, and is considered part of Northern Michigan. As an unincorporated community, Karlin has no legally defined boundaries or population statistics of its own.

History 
An extension of the Manistee and North-Eastern Railroad northeast of Nessen City was completed in 1890. Edward Wilson was the first postmaster at Horicon. The name of the community was changed in 1903 to Karlin, after Karlín, Austria-Hungary, from whence a number of local settlers originated. The railroad line running through Karlin was removed in 1934.

See also 

 List of U.S. places named after non-U.S. places

References 

Unincorporated communities in Michigan
Unincorporated communities in Grand Traverse County, Michigan
Traverse City micropolitan area
Populated places established in 1897
1897 establishments in Michigan